Still Life is the second solo album by Renaissance vocalist Annie Haslam, recorded with Louis Clark and the Royal Philharmonic Orchestra in 1985. The album consisted of popular classical tunes set to the lyrics of poet and Renaissance lyricist Betty Thatcher. A remastered two-disc edition was released on April 25, 2011, with the second disc offering an instrumental version of each song.

Reception

The Bolton News described Still Life as the marriage of classical and popular music at its very best. Allmusic's Tomas Mureika retrospectively called it "one of Haslam's career highlights: a gorgeous, lyrical, and endlessly listenable collection of classical pop nuggets, topped off with brilliant—often profound—lyrics."

Track listing
 "Forever Bound" (Adagio cantabile from Symphony No. 5, Tchaikovsky)
 "Still Life" (Air from Suite No. 3 in D major, J. S. Bach)
 "One Day" (Berceuse from Dolly, Fauré)
 "Ave Verum" (Mozart)
 "Shine" (Gymnopédie No. 2, Satie)
 "Careless Love" (Étude Op. 10 No. 3, Chopin)
 "Glitter and Dust" (Swan Lake, Tchaikovsky)
 "The Day You Strayed" (Pavane, Fauré)
 "Save Us All" (Adagio in G minor, Giazotto)
 "Skaila" (La Calinda, Delius)
 "Bitter Sweet" (The Swan from Carnival of the Animals, Saint-Saëns)
 "Chains and Threads" (Tannhäuser, Wagner)

Additional musicians
Skaila Kanga - harp
Trevor Bastow - piano
Andy Pask - bass guitar
Barry de Souza - drums

Notes

References

1985 albums
Royal Philharmonic Orchestra albums